The 2022 Polish Open was a professional tennis tournament played on outdoor hard courts. It was the third edition of the tournament which was part of the 2022 ITF Women's World Tennis Tour. It took place in Grodzisk Mazowiecki, Poland between 1 and 7 August 2022.

Champions

Singles

  Kateřina Siniaková def.  Magda Linette, 6–4, 6–1

Doubles

  Alicia Barnett /  Olivia Nicholls def.  Vivian Heisen /  Katarzyna Kawa 6–1, 7–6(7–3)

Singles main draw entrants

Seeds

 1 Rankings are as of 25 July 2022.

Other entrants
The following players received wildcards into the singles main draw:
  Magdalena Fręch
  Lucie Havlíčková
  Ania Hertel
  Martyna Kubka
  Valeriia Olianovskaia

The following players received entry into the singles main draw using protected rankings:
  Zoe Hives
  Kaylah McPhee
  Yanina Wickmayer

The following players received entry from the qualifying draw:
  Alicia Barnett
  Nikola Břečková
  Iveta Dapkutė
  Kristina Dmitruk
  Olivia Lincer
  Laetitia Pulchartová
  Stefania Rogozińska Dzik
  Laura Svatíková

The following player received entry as a lucky loser:
  Amy Zhu

References

External links
 2022 Polish Open at ITFtennis.com
 Official website

2022 ITF Women's World Tennis Tour
2022 in Polish tennis
August 2022 sports events in Poland